Ashkan Shokoofi (born 9 July 1981) is an Iranian tennis player.

Shokoofi has a career high ATP singles ranking of 861 achieved on 4 October 2004. He also has a career high ATP doubles ranking of 719 achieved on 10 July 2006.

Shokoofi represents Iran at the Davis Cup where he has a W/L record of 24–25.

Future and Challenger finals

Doubles 3 (2–1)

External links
 
 
 

1981 births
Living people
Iranian male tennis players
Sportspeople from Tehran